Abharrood (meaning Abhar's river) is a river in Iran that runs between Abhar and Qom.

Rivers of Qom Province
Landforms of Qom Province
Landforms of Zanjan Province